Wawaset Park is a planned community national historic district located on the western edge of the City of Wilmington, New Castle County, Delaware.  The area was formerly the grounds of Schuetzen Park, a horse racing and later auto racing track and fairgrounds.  It was purchased in 1917 by the DuPont Company and developed into single-family houses, semi-detached and row houses to meet the housing need for the company's expanding corporate staff. The historic district encompasses 321 contributing buildings and 1 contributing structure.

The neighborhood's design by noted Baltimore architect Edward L. Palmer, Jr., with curvilinear streets and ample lawns giving it the setting of a suburb within the city, was influenced by the work of Frederick Law Olmsted, and its architecture includes Tudor cottages, Georgian mansions, and elements of the Picturesque and Gothic styles.  The dwellings are unified by slate roofing.

The historic district was added to the National Register of Historic Places in 1986.

Education
It is in the Red Clay Consolidated School District. Zoned schools are Highlands Elementary School, Alexis I. du Pont Middle School, and Alexis I. du Pont High School.

References

External links

 NRHP Site Listing with Photos
 Neighborhood link
 List of Links about Wawaset Park

Garden suburbs
Historic districts in Wilmington, Delaware
Neighborhoods in Wilmington, Delaware
Defunct horse racing venues in the United States
Geography of New Castle County, Delaware
Historic districts on the National Register of Historic Places in Delaware
National Register of Historic Places in Wilmington, Delaware
Event venues on the National Register of Historic Places in Delaware
Sports venues on the National Register of Historic Places
Delaware placenames of Native American origin